New Valamo or New Valaam (or more informally, especially in the postal address: Uusi-Valamo) is an Orthodox monastery in Heinävesi, Finland. The monastery was established in its present location in 1940. However, the tradition of the Valamo monastery dates back to 1717. The monastery was then originally established on Valaam (also known historically by the Finnish name Valamo) which is an archipelago in the northern portion of Lake Ladoga, lying within the Republic of Karelia in the Russian Federation.

The New Valamo Monastery is now an active centre of the Orthodox religious life and culture in Finland and welcomes visitors throughout the year.

History

The relocation of the monastery
In 1939, during the Winter War, some 190 monks from the Valamo Monastery in Karelia were evacuated from their old abode on a group of islands in Lake Ladoga in the Viipuri Province to present Eastern Finland. The old Valamo Monastery was occupied by the armed forces of the Soviet Union quite soon after the outbreak of the Winter War.

After a temporary dwelling place the monks decided to settle down in Heinävesi in Eastern Finland. The choice fell on a mansion in Papinniemi, Heinävesi, after the monks had found there, quite surprisingly, an icon of St. Sergius and St. Herman of Valaam, the founders of the monastery in the 12th century. The monks considered this to be a sign from God. Having received evacuees from the Konevsky (Konevitsa) and Pechenga (Petsamo) monasteries, it is now the only monastery for men of the Finnish Orthodox Church.

2012 Fire

In March 2012, there was a fire in the old main building of Papinniemi estate, which also served as the first main building of the monastery. The building had been built in 1840. The attic of the building was destroyed in the fire. It had been used as a storage space, and there were no valuables in it. All the valuable artefacts from the lower floors had been successfully removed during the fire, with the exception of the furniture. The furnaces of the building has been in poor condition, and their use had been prohibited for several years. However, one of the furnaces had been used for heating, and in a police investigation it was found that the fire had started from the cracks of the chimney. A couple of foreign extraction, who had been living in the building, were prosecuted in the Southern Savo Local Court. The court did not find sufficient evidence to back the claim that the furnace had been used for heating. The case was tried in December 2012.

The damages of the monastery amounted up to 1,6 million Euros. The State of Finland was ordered to pay some of the expenses of the man who had been accused of causing the fire.

The miracle-working icons of Valamo 
The best-known miracle-working icons at Valamo are those of the Mother of God of Konevitsa and the Mother of God of Valamo, both located in the main church.

Monastery activities and economy

Economy
The monks of the New Valamo Monastery live a communal life of spirituality founded in the Ascetic tradition of the Orthodox Church. According to the ancient tradition, the monastery should support itself fully. At present, the main source of livelihood for the New Valamo Monastery is tourism: over 160,000 people visit the monastery each year, and all of the revenue goes directly to wards the maintenance and development of the premises.

As a result of the financial crises 2008 the monastery too has had to face some financial challenges. This has led to for example co-determination procedures. During 2003-2013 the financial reports of the monastery have shown a surplus in two years. 2012 the result was positive mainly because 2012 the monastery received insurance reimbursements due to the fire incident in its main building.

2013 the monastery had debts of one million euros, and annual turnover reaching approximately 2,5m euro. The distillery operations of Valamo have shown healthy results every year, for example 2014 a surplus of 89.000 euros.

Monastery's distillery
The Christian faith is linked by tradition to wine and other alcoholic beverages. Alcoholic beverage making skills have been preserved and passed down within monastery wall for centuries. This tradition continues at the New Valamo Monastery.

The annual capacity of the Valamo distillery is 120,000 litres, and it is the biggest distillery in Finland. During 2014 and 2015 the operative distillery company Viiniherman Ltd has made additional investments of 1 million euros into the distillery. Viiniherman Ltd is owned by majority by the monastery and the distillery is located at the monastery's' premises.

They built a modern 500 square metre warehouse to Ilomantsi, Finland. So they will ship all of the whisky distillates from Valamo to Ilomantsi warehouse for maturation. Some of their whisky will have a church wine cask maturation, while some will be matured in bourbon casks. Valamo will produce peated and unpeated malt whisky. The capacity of the new warehouse is 450,000 liters and their current pot for whisky making is 1,000 liters, which allows for an annual production of 40,000 liters.

Hegumens of the monastery 

The following persons have served as hegumens (father superiors) of the monastery:

 Yefrem 1758–1781
 Nazary 1781–1801
 Innokenty 1801–1823
 Yonafan I 1823–1830
 Varlaam 1830–1833
 Veniamin 1833–1839
 Damaskin 1839–1881
 Yonafan II 1881–1891
 Gabriel 1891–1903
 Vitaly 1903–1905
 Pafnuty 1905–1907
 Mavriky 1907–1918
 Pavlin 1918–1933
 Chariton 1933–1947
 Yeronim 1948–1952
 Nestor 1952–1967
 Simforian 1969–1979
 Panteleimon 1979–1997 (later Metropolitan of Oulu, since 2013 retired)
 Sergei 1997–2011, 2012–2022 (later Bishop of Hamina, vicar bishop of the Helsinki Orthodox Diocese)
 Mikael 2022–

See also
 List of Christian religious houses in Finland

References

External links 

Official site of the New Valamo Monastery in Finland (in English)
Information on the monastery
Pictures of the monastery
Cultural Centre of the Monastery of Valamo
Sounds of the Church Bells of Valamo

Heinävesi
Valamo monastery (Heinävesi)
20th-century Christian monasteries
Neoclassical architecture in Finland
Buildings and structures in South Savo
Museums in South Savo
Religious museums in Finland
Orthodox Church of Finland